Achaetocephala atrata is a species of beetle in the family Carabidae, the only species in the genus Achaetocephala.

References

Platyninae